James Needham may refer to:

 James Needham (explorer) (died 1673), explorer in America 
James Needham (mycologist)  (1849–1913), English working-class mycologist
 James C. Needham (1864–1942), U.S. Representative from California
 James George Needham (1868–1957), American entomologist